Journal of Elasticity: The Physical and Mathematical Science of Solids is a peer-reviewed scientific journal covering all aspects of elasticity. It is published seven times a year by Springer Science+Business Media. The editor-in-chief is Roger Fosdick (University of Minnesota).

Abstracting and indexing 
According to the Journal Citation Reports, the journal had a 2020 impact factor of 2.085. The journal is abstracted and indexed in:

 Academic OneFile
 Astrophysics Data System
 GeoRef
 INSPEC
 VINITI
 Science Citation Index
 Scopus

References

External links 
 

Springer Science+Business Media academic journals
Publications established in 1971
English-language journals
Physics journals
7 times per year journals